Corbas is a commune in the Metropolis of Lyon in Rhône-Alpes region in eastern France.

Demographics

Twin towns
Corbas is twinned with:

  Corbetta, Lombardy, Italy

References

External links

Official site

Communes of Lyon Metropolis
Dauphiné

sr:Корба